Cross My Heart: An Introduction to Phil Ochs is a British best-of compilation of the U.S. folk singer's A&M recordings.  The CD features three tracks each from Pleasures of the Harbor, Tape from California, and Rehearsals for Retirement as well as two from Greatest Hits and one from Gunfight at Carnegie Hall, with the thirteenth track the B-side to his 1973 Africa-only single, "Niko Mchumba Ngobe". Overall, this is a more diverse collection than 2002's 20th Century Masters: The Millennium Collection: The Best of Phil Ochs, which tips the balance more heavily toward Pleasures of the Harbor.

Track listing
All songs by Phil Ochs unless otherwise noted.
"Chords of Fame" – 3:32
"Cross My Heart" – 3:18
"Rehearsals for Retirement" – 4:12
"Crucifixion" – 8:44
"White Boots Marching in a Yellow Land" – 3:31
"The Scorpion Departs But Never Returns" – 4:16
"The War Is Over" – 4:23
"Niko Mchumba Ngobe" (P. Ochs and Dijiba-Bukasa) – 3:03
"Joe Hill" – 7:20
"Jim Dean of Indiana" – 5:02
"Pretty Smart on My Part" – 3:18
"Pleasures of the Harbor" – 8:07
"I Ain't Marchin' Anymore" – 3:49

Personnel 

Robert Altman – Cover Photo
Joe Black – Project Coordinator
Sid Griffin – Sleeve Notes
Larry Marks – Producer
Keiron McGarry – Remastering
Phil Ochs – Producer
Van Dyke Parks – Producer

Source listing
Tracks 1 and 10 from Greatest Hits (1970)
Tracks 2, 4 and 12 from Pleasures Of The Harbor (1967)
Tracks 3, 6 and 11 from Rehearsals For Retirement (1969)
Tracks 5, 7 and 9 from Tape From California (1968)
Track 8 from the 1973 single
Track 13 from Gunfight At Carnegie Hall (1974)

References

2004 greatest hits albums
Phil Ochs compilation albums
A&M Records compilation albums